Cieciórki is a village in the administrative district of Gmina Płońsk, within Płońsk County, Masovian Voivodeship, in east-central Poland.

References

Villages in Płońsk County